Consueverunt Romani Pontifices is a papal bull by Pope Pius V issued on September 17th, 1569 on the rosary. This papal bull instituted the essence of the rosary's present configuration.

The Pope made it clear that there are two essential elements of the Rosary: vocal prayer and mental prayer.

The papal bull refers to the Dominican roots of the Rosary and fact that as a young friar, Pope Pius V had been a member of the Dominican Order:

And so Dominic looked to that simple way of praying and beseeching God, accessible to all and wholly pious, which is called the Rosary, or Psalter of the Blessed Virgin Mary, in which the same most Blessed Virgin is venerated by the angelic greeting repeated one hundred and fifty times, that is, according to the number of the Davidic Psalter, and by the Lord's Prayer with each decade. Interposed with these prayers are certain meditations showing forth the entire life of Our Lord Jesus Christ, thus completing the method of prayer devised by the Fathers of the Holy Roman Church.

In this papal bull Pius V also confirmed the indults and indulgences which his predecessors had granted to those who pray the Rosary.

This 1569 document is distinct from an Apostolic Letter with the same title issued in November 2000, which declared the St. Giles church in Bardejov, Slovakia, a basilica minor.

See also
 Augustissimae Virginis Mariae - Leo XIII on the Confraternity of the Holy Rosary

Notes

External links
 Pope Pius V, ''Consueverunt Romani", September 17, 1569 

Documents of Pope Pius V